Stefan Hnydziński (29 July 1901 – 2 October 1939) was a Polish film actor. He appeared in more than 25 films from 1926 to 1939. Hnydziński died of wounds sustained during the bombing of Warsaw in 1939.

Selected filmography
 Dodek na froncie (1936)
 Bohaterowie Sybiru (1936)
 Róża (1936)
 Kobiety nad przepaścią (1938)
 Second Youth (1938)
 Gehenna (1938)
 Złota Maska (1939)

References

External links

1901 births
1939 deaths
Polish male film actors
Polish male silent film actors
People from the Kingdom of Galicia and Lodomeria
People from Przemyśl
Polish Austro-Hungarians
Polish male stage actors
20th-century Polish male actors
Polish civilians killed in World War II
Deaths by airstrike during World War II